Phlox pulvinata is a species of phlox known by the common name cushion phlox. It is native to the western United States where it grows in mountain and plateau habitat, in rocky subalpine and alpine climates, including exposed tundra habitat. It is a perennial herb taking a flat, dense, cushionlike form on the ground. The plant is among the first to flower in the spring in many areas. It blooms densely, forming carpets of flowers.

References

External links
Jepson Manual Treatment
Photo gallery

pulvinata
Flora of North America